The ČSD Class ES 499.2 (Now ČD class 372 and 371) and DR Class 230 are multisystem electric locomotives, manufactured by Škoda Plzeň from 1988 to 1991. The locomotives were developed to work international trains between Czechoslovakia and the DDR. The locomotives are similar to the 163, 263 and 363 classes, but differ in electrical equipment, due to the need to operate across borders. 35 were produced, originally split between the Czechoslovak State Railways (ČSD) and the Deutsche Reichsbahn.

History 
In the 1970s, the Deutsche Reichsbahn electrified the Děčín–Dresden-Neustadt railway between Dresden and Schöna, near the Czech border, using the standard German electrification of 15 kV 16  Hz. Across the Czechoslovak border, railways were electrified with 3 kV DC, creating a gap between Schöna and Děčín, which required trains to be diesel hauled. To solve this problem, it was decided to develop a class of locomotives that could operate on both the German AC and the Czech DC electrification systems.

Numbering 
The locomotives were intended to be delivered as ČSD Class ES 499.2 and DR Class 230, however, by time of delivery the ČSD has moved to numerical numbering, so the Czech locomotives were delivered as Class 372. The German examples were later renumbered to DB 180 class, due to the merger of Deutsche Bundesbahn and Deutsche Reichsbahn to form Deutsche Bahn AG.

References 

Škoda locomotives
Electric locomotives of Czechoslovakia
Electric locomotives of Germany
Electric locomotives of the Czech Republic
Passenger locomotives
Bo′Bo′ electric locomotives of Europe